Wojenne dziewczyny (English: War Girls) is a Polish World War II sensationalist television drama series, broadcast on TVP1. It premiered on 5 March 2017 and has four seasons.

Plot

The series follows the lives of three women, showing them briefly at the outbreak of the war in September 1939 before flashing forward to 1941. Ewa Fronczak is released from her prison sentence for theft on account of the falling bombs; Marysia Joachim and her family are terrorised by anti-semitic Nazi sympathisers; Irena Szczęsna helps the nurses at a hospital with the wounded. Ewa and Irka know each other from before the war; they first meet Marysia after Ewa steals her wallet, including her false identity documents, at a train station. They join the underground resistance movement and are initially appointed to serve in the small sabotage unit.

Cast 
 Aleksandra Pisula as Marysia Joachim
 Vanessa Aleksander as Ewa Fronczak
 Marta Mazurek as Irena 'Irka' Szczęsna
 Michał Czernecki as Witold Szczęsny
 Danuta Stenka as Irka and Witold's mother
 Józef Pawłowski as Kamil Brodzki, Irka's fiancé
 Kamil Szeptycki as Jurek Bednar
 Krzysztof Franieczek as Oskar Dietrich
 Katrin Bühring as Margarethe von Losein, Dietrich's sister
 Krzysztof Wach as sturmbannführer Kleim 
 Aleksandra Justa as Henryka Brodzka
 Vinzenz Wagner as Franz Hessler

Episodes 
Since the 31st of October 2021, there have been 46 episodes (4 seasons) of Wojenne Dziewczyny. 13 episodes in Season 1, 2 and 3 and 7 episodes in Season 4. There have been plans for a fifth season.

Polish drama television series
World War II television drama series
Television shows set in Poland
2017 Polish television series debuts
2022 Polish television series endings
2010s Polish television series
2020s Polish television series
Telewizja Polska original programming